St Michael South Elmham is a village and civil parish in the north of the English county of Suffolk. It is one of the villages surrounding Bungay which make up the area known as The Saints.

The parish is sparsely populated with an estimated population of around 60. It borders the parishes of St Peter South Elmham, All Saints and St Nicholas South Elmham, Ilketshall St Margaret and Rumburgh. The parish council operates jointly with All Saints and St Nicholas and St Michael.

With no residents killed during World War I, the village is one of two Thankful Village in Suffolk. It is one of only fourteen doubly thankful villages in England, in that it lost no residents in World War II either.

Notes

References

External links

Villages in Suffolk
Civil parishes in Suffolk
Waveney District